Destino is an animated short film released in 2003 by Walt Disney Animation Studios. Destino is unique in that its production originally began in 1945, 58 years before its eventual completion in 2003. The project was originally a collaboration between Walt Disney and Spanish painter Salvador Dalí, and features music written by Mexican songwriter Armando Domínguez and performed by Mexican singer Dora Luz. It was included in the Animation Show of Shows in 2003.

History 
Destino (Spanish for "Destiny") was storyboarded by Disney studio artist John Hench and artist Salvador Dalí for eight months in late 1945 and 1946; however production ceased not long after. The Walt Disney Company, then Walt Disney Studios, was plagued by financial woes in the World War II era. Hench compiled a short animation test of about 17 seconds in the hopes of rekindling Disney's interest in the project, but the production was no longer deemed financially viable and put on indefinite hiatus.

In 1999, Walt Disney's nephew Roy E. Disney, while working on Fantasia 2000, unearthed the dormant project and decided to bring it back to life. Walt Disney Studios Paris, the company's small Parisian production department, was brought on board to complete the project. The short was produced by Baker Bloodworth and directed by French animator Dominique Monféry in his first directorial role. A team of approximately 25 animators deciphered Dalí and Hench's cryptic storyboards (with a little help from the journals of Dalí's wife Gala Dalí and guidance from Hench himself), and finished Destinos production. The end result is mostly traditional animation, including Hench's original footage, but it also contains some computer animation.

Plot
The seven-minute short follows the story of Chronos and his ill-fated love for a mortal woman named Dahlia. The story continues as Dahlia dances through surreal scenery inspired by Dalí's paintings. There is no dialogue, but the soundtrack includes music by the Mexican composer Armando Dominguez. The 17-second original footage that is included in the finished product is the segment with the two tortoises (the original footage is also shown in Bette Midler's host sequence for The Steadfast Tin Soldier in Fantasia 2000, where she referred to Destino as an "idea that featured baseball as a metaphor for life").

Public screenings
Destino premiered on June 2, 2003 at the Annecy International Animated Film Festival in Annecy, France. The film was nominated for the Academy Award for Best Animated Short Film of 2003. In 2004, Destino was released theatrically in a very limited release with the animated film The Triplets of Belleville, and also with Calendar Girls.

In 2005, the film was shown continuously as part of a major retrospective Dalí show at the Philadelphia Museum of Art, titled The Dalí renaissance: new perspectives on his life and art after 1940.

The film was also shown as part of the exhibition Dalí & Film at Tate Modern from June to September 2007, as part of the Dalí exhibit at the Los Angeles County Museum of Art from October 2007 to January 2008;  at an exhibition at New York's Museum of Modern Art called Dalí: Painting and Film from June to September 2008; also at an exhibit at the Dalí Museum in St. Petersburg, Florida in 2008. In mid-2009, it had exposure in Melbourne, Australia at the National Gallery of Victoria through the Dalí exhibition Liquid Desire, and from late 2009 through April 2010 at the Dayton Art Institute in Dayton, Ohio, in an exhibit entitled Dalí and Disney: The Art and Animation of Destino.

In 2012, the film was featured in the "Dalí" exhibition at the Centre Georges Pompidou in Paris, France and at the Museo Reina Sofía, Madrid, Spain.

In 2019, Destino was featured in the Dalí exhibition at Potsdamer Platz (Berlin).

In 2022, Destino was being shown on a continuous loop in the exhibition "Objects of Desire: Surrealism and Design 1924 – Today" which ran from 14th October 2022 through to 19th February 2023 at the London Design Museum in Kensington High Street.

Home media
The Disney DVD True-Life Adventures, Volume 3 has a trailer for Destino, and mentions a forthcoming DVD release. Destino was made available on the Fantasia & Fantasia 2000 Special Edition Blu-ray released on November 30, 2010, as well as on the standalone Fantasia 2000 Blu-ray. A standalone DVD release has also been made available exclusively from the Salvador Dalí Museum and Dalí Theatre and Museum. These releases were accompanied by a feature length documentary on the project called "Dali & Disney: A Date with Destino". Destino was released on the Disney+ streaming service in January 2020.

Notes

Additional production by Walt Disney Feature Animation Paris

References

Further reading

Dali and Disney: A Date With Destino - via YouTube

External links 

2003 animated films
2000s avant-garde and experimental films
2003 films
2000s Disney animated short films
Fantasia (franchise)
Animated films without speech
Film with screenplays by Salvador Dalí
Walt Disney